Abigail Salisbury is an American politician. A Democrat who previously served as president of the Swissvale Borough Council, she is currently a member of the Pennsylvania House of Representatives, representing the 34th district.

She was elected in a 2023 special election to succeed Summer Lee, who resigned on December 7, 2022, after being elected to represent Pennsylvania's 12th congressional district in the United States House of Representatives.

Electoral history

References

External links

Abigail Salisbury, Pennsylvania House of Representatives (official website)

21st-century American politicians
21st-century American women politicians
Women state legislators in Pennsylvania
Democratic Party members of the Pennsylvania House of Representatives
Living people
1982 births
People from Swissvale, Pennsylvania